Botryarrhena is a genus of flowering plants in the family Rubiaceae. It was described by Adolpho Ducke in 1932. It only holds two species, occurring in Brazil, Colombia, Peru and Venezuela.

Species
 Botryarrhena pendula Ducke - Venezuela, Colombia, Brazil
 Botryarrhena venezuelensis Steyerm. - Venezuela, Perú

References

External links
Botryarrhena in the World Checklist of Rubiaceae

Rubiaceae genera
Cordiereae
Taxa named by Adolpho Ducke